Tanda Dam or Tanda Lake is a small dam and also a lake view park located in Kohat District of Khyber Pakhtunkhwa province, Pakistan. The dam supplies water for irrigation to Jurma, Shahpur and many villages by means of canals from Tanda Lake.

It became operational on 17 July 1967, though it was inaugurated by the then President Ayub Khan in 1962.

Tanda Lake is a protected site under the Ramsar Convention, an international treaty for the conservation and sustainable utilization of wetlands. It was included as a Ramsar site on 23 July 1976. The lake is home to migratory birds from Siberia and the Caspian during winter.

Incident

On 29 January 2023, 49 children and two adults drowned when their boat capsized on the dam. The boat they were travelling on was carrying people on a daytrip from a local madrassa when it overturned.

References

External links 

 A site with GoogleMaps for Ramsar sites in Pakistan

Ramsar sites in Pakistan
Dams in Khyber Pakhtunkhwa
Kohat District